SS Vesta was a propeller-driven fishing vessel 250 gross tons, built in 1853 at Nantes, France, by Hernoux et Cie of Dieppe for the Société Terreneuvienne of Granville in Normandy. The company had extensive fishing interests in the Grand Banks area off Newfoundland, which it operated from a base in Saint Pierre Island. On 27 September 1854 Vesta was eastbound with a crew of 50, returning 147 fisherman and salters home. In a heavy fog, Vesta collided with the Collins Line passenger paddle steamer SS Arctic.  A  section of Vestas bow was sheared off, but the watertight bulkhead behind the bow remained intact and kept out the sea, keeping the vessel afloat.

The much larger Arctic, which initially had appeared to have sustained only superficial damage, had been fatally holed below the waterline. Lacking watertight compartments, the hull filled with water and the ship sank, four hours later, with great loss of life. By contrast, the only casualties from Vestas  crew and passengers were about a dozen who precipitately left the ship in a lifeboat, which was then accidentally run down by the Arctic.

After the collision, Vestas  captain, Alphonse Duchesne, brought the ship slowly to St John's, Newfoundland, which she reached on 29 September, and was repaired. On 20 March 1855 Vesta sailed for home, and was forced into Liverpool after fighting ice and storms for 17 days. Later that year she was sold to the Compagnie Générale Maritime of Le Havre, and after further changes of ownership, passed in 1863 to J Amann of Bilbao and was renamed Amberes. She was used as a freighter, generally working between northern Spanish ports and Antwerp. In 1875, the shipping registers reported her as sunk  in Santander harbour.

See also
SS Arctic disaster

Notes and references
Citations

Sources
A.C. Brown: Women and Children Last. Frederick Muller, London 1962
William H Flayhart: Perils of the Atlantic: Steamship Disasters, 1850 to the Present. W.W. Norton, New York 2003
Lincoln P Paine:  Ships of the World:  An Historical Encyclopedia.  Houghton Mifflin, Boston 1997
David W Shaw: The Sea Shall Embrace Them. The Free Press, New York 2002

Maritime incidents in September 1854
Ships built in France
1853 ships
Merchant ships of France
Steamships of France
Maritime incidents in 1875
Merchant ships of Spain
Steamships of Spain